Limbic resonance is the idea that the capacity for sharing deep emotional states arises from the limbic system of the brain. These states include the dopamine circuit-promoted feelings of empathic harmony, and the norepinephrine circuit-originated emotional states of fear, anxiety and anger.

The concept was advanced in the book A General Theory of Love (2000), and is one of three interrelated concepts central to the book's premise: that our brain chemistry and nervous systems are measurably affected by those closest to us (limbic resonance); that our systems synchronize with one another in a way that has profound implications for personality and lifelong emotional health (limbic regulation); and that these set patterns can be modified through therapeutic practice (limbic revision).

In other words, it refers to the capacity for empathy and non-verbal connection that is present in mammals, and that forms the basis of our social connections as well as the foundation for various modes of therapy and healing. According to the authors (Thomas Lewis, M.D, Fari Amini, M.D. and Richard Lannon, M.D.), our nervous systems are not self-contained, but rather demonstrably attuned to those around us with whom we share a close connection. "Within the effulgence of their new brain, mammals developed a capacity we call 'limbic resonance' — a symphony of mutual exchange and internal adaptation whereby two mammals become attuned to each other's inner states."

This notion of limbic resonance builds on previous formulations and similar ideas. For example, the authors retell at length the notorious experiments of Harry Harlow establishing the importance of physical contact and affection in social and cognitive development of rhesus monkeys. They also make extensive use of subsequent research by Tiffany Field in mother/infant contact, Paul D. MacLean on the triune brain (reptilian, limbic, and neocortex), and the work of G.W. Kraemer.

Importance and history 

Lewis, Amini and Lannon first make their case by examining a story from the dawn of scientific experimentation in human development when in the thirteenth century Frederick II raised a group of infants to be completely cut off from human interaction, other than the most basic care and feeding, so as to discover what language would spontaneously arise in the absence of any communication prompts. The result of this notorious experiment was that the infants, deprived of any human discourse or affection, all died.

The authors find the hegemony of Freudian theory in the early days of psychology and psychiatry to be almost as harmful as the ideas of Frederick II.  They condemn the focus on cerebral insight, and the ideal of a cold, emotionless analyst, as negating the very benefit that psychotherapy can confer by virtue of the empathetic bond and neurological reconditioning that can occur in the course of sustained therapeutic sessions.  "Freud's enviable advantage is that he never seriously undertook to follow his own advice.  Many promising young therapists have their responsiveness expunged, as they are taught to be dutifully neutral observers, avoiding emotional contact....But since therapy is limbic relatedness, emotional neutrality drains life out of the process..."

A General Theory of Love is scarcely more sympathetic to Dr. Benjamin Spock and his "monumentally influential volume" Baby and Child Care, especially given Spock's role in promoting the movement against co-sleeping, or allowing infants to sleep in the same bed as their parents. Lewis, Amini and Lannon cite the research of sleep scientist James McKenna, which seems to suggest that the limbic regulation between sleeping parents and infants is essential to the neurological development of the latter and a major factor in preventing Sudden Infant Death Syndrome (SIDS). "The temporal unfolding of particular sleep stages and awake periods of the mother and infant become entwined....on a minute to minute basis, throughout the night, much sensory communication is occurring between them."

Subsequent use of the term
Since the first publication of A General Theory of Love in 2000, the term limbic resonance has gained popularity with subsequent writers and researchers. The term brings a higher degree of specificity to the ongoing discourse in psychological literature concerning the importance of empathy and relatedness. In "A handbook of Psychology" (2003) a clear path is traced from Winnicott 1965 identifying the concept of mother and child as a relational organism or dyad and goes on to examine the interrelation of social and emotional responding with neurological development and the role of the limbic system in regulating response to stress.

Limbic resonance is also referred to as "empathic resonance", as in the book Empathy in Mental Illness (2007), which establishes the centrality of empathy or lack thereof in a range of individual and social pathologies. The authors Farrow and Woodruff cite the work of Maclean, 1985, as establishing that "Empathy is perhaps the heart of mammalian development, limbic regulation and social organization", as well as research by Carr et al., 2003, who used fMRI to map brain activity during the observation and imitation of emotional facial expressions, concluding that "we understand the feelings of others via a mechanism of action representation that shapes emotional content and that our empathic resonance is grounded in the experience of our bodies in action and the emotions associated with specific bodily movements". Other studies cited examine the link between mirror neurons (activated during such mimicking activity) and the limbic system, such as Chartrand & Bargh, 1999: "Mirror neurone areas seem to monitor this interdependence, this intimacy, this sense of collective agency that comes out of social interactions and that is tightly linked to the ability to form empathic resonance."

Limbic resonance and limbic regulation are also referred to as "mood contagion" or "emotional contagion" as in the work of Sigal Barsade and colleagues at the Yale School of Management.
In The Wise Heart, Buddhist teacher Jack Kornfield echoes the musical metaphor of the original definition of "limbic resonance" offered by authors Lewis, Amini and Lannon of A General Theory of Love, and correlates these findings of Western psychology with the tenets of Buddhism: "Each time we meet another human being and honor their dignity, we help those around us. Their hearts resonate with ours in exactly the same way the strings of an unplucked violin vibrate with the sounds of a violin played nearby. Western psychology has documented this phenomenon of 'mood contagion' or limbic resonance. If a person filled with panic or hatred walks into a room, we feel it immediately, and unless we are very mindful, that person's negative state will begin to overtake our own. When a joyfully expressive person walks into a room, we can feel that state as well."

In March 2010, citing A General Theory of Love, Kevin Slavin referred to limbic resonance in considering the dynamics of Social television. Slavin suggests that the laugh track evolved to provide the audience—alone at home—with a sense that others around them were laughing, and that limbic resonance explains the need for that laughing audience.

Limbic regulation
Limbic regulation, mood contagion or emotional contagion is the effect of contact with other people upon the development and stability of personality and mood.

Subsequent use and definitions of the term 

In Living a connected life (2003), Dr. Kathleen Brehony looks at recent brain research which shows the importance of proximity of others in our development. "Especially in infancy, but throughout our lives, our physical bodies are influencing and being influenced by others with whom we feel a connection.  Scientists call this limbic regulation."

Brehony goes on to describe the parallels between the "protest/despair" cycles of an abandoned puppy and human development. Mammals have developed a tendency to experience distraction, anxiety and measurable levels of stress in response to separation from their care-givers and companions, precisely because such separation has historically constituted a threat to their survival. As anyone who has owned a puppy can attest, when left alone it will cry, bark, howl, and seek to rejoin its human or canine companions. If these efforts are unsuccessful and the isolation is prolonged, it will sink into a state of dejection and despair. The marginal effectiveness of placing a ticking clock in the puppy's bed is based on a universal need in mammals to synchronize to the rhythms of their fellow creatures.

Limbic resonance and limbic regulation are also referred to as "mood contagion" or "emotional contagion" as in the work of Sigal Barsade. Barsade and colleagues at the Yale School of Management build on research in social cognition, and find that some emotions, especially positive ones, are spread more easily than others through such "interpersonal limbic regulation".

Author Daniel Goleman has explored similar terrain across several works: in Emotional Intelligence (1995), an international best seller, The Joy Of Living, coauthored with Yongey Mingyur Rinpoche, and the Harvard Business Review on Breakthrough Leadership. In the latter book, Goleman considers the "open loop nature of the brain's limbic system" which depends on external sources to manage itself, and examines the implications of interpersonal limbic regulation and the science of moods on leadership.

In Mindfully Green: A Personal and Spiritual Guide to Whole Earth Thinking (2003) author Staphine Kaza defines the term as follows: "Limbic regulation is a mutual simultaneous exchange of body signals that unfolds between people who are deeply involved with each other, especially parents and children." She goes on to correlate love with limbic engagement and asserts that children raised with love learn and remember better than those who are abused. Kaza then proposes to "take this work a step further from a systems perspective, and imagine that a child learns through some sort of limbic regulation with nature".

Limbic revision
Limbic revision is the therapeutic alteration of personality residing in the human limbic system of the brain.

Relation to affect regulation and limbic resonance
Dr. Allan Schore, of the UCLA David Geffen School of Medicine, has explored related ideas beginning with his book Affect Regulation and the Origin of the Self published in 1994. Dr. Shore looks at the contribution of the limbic system to the preservation of the species, its role in forming social bonds with other members of the species and intimate relations leading to reproduction. "It is said that natural selection favors characteristics that maximize an individual's contribution of the gene pool of succeeding generations. In humans this may entail not so much competitive and aggressive traits as an ability to enter into a positive affective relationship with a member of the opposite sex." In his subsequent book Affect regulation & the repair of the self, Schor correlates the "interactive transfer of affect" between mother and infant, on the one hand, and in a therapeutic context on the other, and describes it as "intersubjectivity". He then goes on to explore what developmental neuropsychology can reveal about both types of interrelatedness.

In Integrative Medicine: Principles for Practice, authors Kligler and Lee state "The empathic therapist offers a form of affect regulation. The roots of empathy — Limbic resonance — are found in the early caregiver experiences, which shape the ways the child learns to experience, share, and communicate affects."

In popular culture 

Limbic Resonance is the title of the first episode of the Netflix series Sense8, the episode describes how eight uniquely different people from across the globe start seeing and hearing things after inexplicably seeing a vision of a woman they've never met before.

See also
 Linguistic empathy

References

Behavioural sciences
Interpersonal relationships
Human development
Neuropsychology
Cognitive neuroscience
Limbic system
Attachment theory